Huffmanela ossicola is a parasitic nematode.  It has been observed in the branchial arch bone and the spinal cord bone (as well as others) of the labrid marine fishes Bodianus loxozonus, Bodianus busellatus  and Bodianus perditio   caught off New Caledonia. This is the first species of Huffmanela reported from bone tissue. Its eggs are only available for the continuation of the life-cycle after the host's death.

Description 
The adults are unknown; only the eggs were described. The eggs are large, 72–88 micrometers in length and 32–40 micrometers in width, with a thick shell. Each egg is covered with numerous filaments enclosed in a thin envelope.

See also 
 Huffmanela filamentosa
 Huffmanela branchialis

References 

Enoplea
Parasitic nematodes of fish
Nematodes described in 2004